Franz Engelbert Barbo von Waxenstein (21 July 1664 – 25 December 1706) was a Carniolan nobleman who was the Count of Waxenstein and Baron of Gutteneck, Päßberg and Zobelsberg. He served as Titular Bishop of Dara and Auxiliary Bishop of Breslau.

Life 
Franz Engelbert Barbo von Waxenstein was born on 21 July 1664 in Carniola. He was a member of the noble family Barbo von Waxenstein and the second son of Maximilian Valerius, Imperial Count of Barbo von Waxenstein and Maria Christiane, Baroness von Brenner. His mother chose a religious career for him, and so he was educated to be a priest. He attended the Collegium Germanicum in Rome from 1684 until 1688, when he was ordained as a Catholic priest.

He was appointed Auxiliary bishop of Breslau by Pope Clement XI in 1703, succeeding Bishop Johann Brunetti. He was also appointed to the position of Titular bishop of Dara the same year.

He died on 25 December 1706 in Breslau.

References 

1664 births
1706 deaths
17th-century Carniolan people
18th-century Carniolan people
Franz
Counts of Germany
Carniolan nobility
Carniolan Roman Catholic priests
Slovene nobility
18th-century Roman Catholic bishops in the Holy Roman Empire
18th-century Roman Catholic titular bishops